Owen Money MBE (born Lynn Mittell, 16 May 1947) is a Welsh musician, actor, comedian, and radio presenter. He was born in Merthyr Tydfil, Wales.

In the 2007 New Year Honours, Money was made an MBE for services to entertainment in Wales.

The Bystanders
Mittell was bassist of Merthyr Tydfil-based band The Crescendos, who amalgamated with another Merthyr band The Rebels to form The Bystanders in 1962. Mittell changed his name to Gerry Braden, and became lead singer in a line-up with:
 Micky Jones – guitar and vocals
 Clive John - guitar, keyboards and vocals
 Ray Williams - bass
 Jeff Jones - drums

The band signed to the record label Pylot records in 1963, with initial release "That's The End", with "This Time" as the 'B' side. They were then signed to Pye Records, where they released the double-sided cover single "98.6" (backed with Marvin Gaye's "Stubborn Kind Of Fellow"), which peaked at number forty five on the UK Singles Chart in February 1967

Gerry Braden left The Bystanders in 1967, to be replaced by Vic Oakley from The Meteorites, who was, in turn, replaced by Deke Leonard, when The Bystanders became Man.

Owen Money reformed the Bystanders in 1998 for a one-off performance at Maesteg Town Hall for his TV programme

Tomfoolery
Mittell formed comedy entertainment Tomfoolery in 1974, which rapidly became a successful comedy show band, topping the bill at South Pier, Blackpool. The band toured extensively in the UK and Europe, winning many comedy awards on the way. In 1980 Owen Money left Tomfoolery for the comedy circuit, starting a tradition for the band where members come and go, including ex-lead singer Brian Conley.

1980 and onwards
Owen Money toured the club circuit as a comedian, winning the Club Land "Comedian of the Year" award, performing alongside Shirley Bassey and Tom Jones.

In 1987, Money joined BBC Radio Wales with weekly programme "Money for Nothing", which increased in popularity through 1997 to win two gold Sony Radio Academy Awards: one for "Regional Broadcaster of the Year", and the other for "Best Music Sequence Programme of Year". "Money for Nothing" is presently broadcast every Saturday morning.

Money regularly appears with his band the Travelling Wrinklies, and takes the "Owen Money Laughter Show" to venues around Wales and South West England.

Business interests
Money used to be the landlord of a pub called The LA in Swansea. It was originally named the Hafod Inn; Money used to say that LA stood for "Lower 'Afod". The pub is now the Hafod Inn once again.

Money was formerly a director and chairman of Merthyr Tydfil FC, and was instrumental in trying to bring Paul Gascoigne to the club.

Pantomime
In 2000, after appearing himself in pantomime, he set up his own pantomime company, The Owen Money Theatre Company, with the aim of taking family friendly pantomimes around the theatres of Wales from November to February. The first production was Aladdin, followed by Cinderella (2001/02), Jack And The Beanstalk (2002/03), Dick Whittington (2003/04), Aladdin (2004/05), Robinson Crusoe (2005/06), Peter Pan (2006/07), Cinderella (2007/08), Jack And The Beanstalk (2007), Adult pantomime Buttons Undone - The Cinderella Story continues... (2008), Robinson Crusoe (2008), Aladdin (2009), Dick Whittington (2010), Peter Pan 2011/2012), Babes in the Wood (2012/2013), Aladdin (2013/2014).

Personal life
Married, Money lives in Porthcawl, and has a daughter Katie and a son Mathew. He has a niece who lives in Merthyr Tydfil called Deni Davies.

In March 2006, he suffered a minor stroke while at his holiday home in Thailand. He flew back home, and was admitted to hospital in Swansea's Morriston Hospital.

Under his given name of Lynn Mittell, Owen Money was awarded an MBE in the Queen's New Year Honours List 2007. The citation reads: "Radio Presenter and Comedy Music Performer. For services to entertainment in Wales".

References

External links
 Official website
 Money for Nothing (BBC Radio Wales)
 Owen Money's Solid Gold Sunday (BBC Radio Wales)
 Details of Owen Money theatre company

1947 births
Living people
People from Merthyr Tydfil
Welsh male singers
Welsh comedians
Welsh radio presenters
Welsh television presenters
BBC Radio Wales presenters
Members of the Order of the British Empire